Paratettix is a genus of ground-hoppers or pygmy grasshoppers, with more than 60 described species found worldwide.

Species
These species have been assigned to the genus Paratettix:

 Paratettix africanus Bolívar, I., 1908 c g
 Paratettix alatus Hancock, J.L., 1915 c g
 Paratettix albescens (Walker, F., 1871) c g
 Paratettix amplus Sjöstedt, 1921 c g
 Paratettix antennatus Hebard, 1923 c g
 Paratettix argillaceus (Erichson, 1842) c g (synonyms: P. femoralis)
 Paratettix asbenensis Chopard, 1950 c g
 Paratettix attenuata (Walker, F., 1871) c g
 Paratettix australis (Walker, F., 1871) c g
 Paratettix austronanus Otte, D., 1997 c g
 Paratettix aztecus (Saussure, 1861) i c g b (Aztec pygmy grasshopper)
 synonym: Paratettix rugosus (Scudder, 1863) i c g b (rough-back pygmy grasshopper)
 Paratettix brevipennis (Hancock, 1902) i c g b (short-winged pygmy grasshopper)
 Paratettix bruneri (Hancock, J.L., 1906) c g
 Paratettix chagosensis Bolívar, I., 1912 c g
 Paratettix chopardi Günther, K., 1979 c g
 Paratettix cingalensis (Walker, F., 1871) c g
 Paratettix crassus Sjöstedt, 1936 c g
 Paratettix cucullatus (Burmeister, 1838) i c g b (hooded grouse locust)
 Paratettix curtipennis (Hancock, J.L., 1912) c g
 Paratettix feejeeanus Bruner, L., 1916 c g
 Paratettix freygessneri Saussure, 1887 i
 Paratettix freygessnerii Bolívar, I., 1887 c g
 Paratettix gentilis Günther, K., 1936 c g
 Paratettix gibbosulus Günther, K., 1979 c g
 Paratettix gilloni Günther, K., 1979 c g
 Paratettix gracilis (Bruner, L., 1906) c g
 Paratettix hachijoensis Shiraki, 1906 c g
 Paratettix hastata (Walker, F., 1871) c g
 Paratettix heteropus Bolívar, I., 1896 c g
 Paratettix histricus (Stål, 1861) c g
 Paratettix ignobilis (Walker, F., 1871) c g
 Paratettix infelix Günther, K., 1938 c g
 Paratettix iranica Uvarov, 1952 c g
 Paratettix iranicus Uvarov & Dirsh, 1952 c
 Paratettix lamellitettigodes Günther, K., 1979 c g
 Paratettix latipennis Hancock, J.L., 1915 c g
 Paratettix lippensi Günther, K., 1979 c g
 Paratettix macrostenus Günther, K., 1979 c g
 Paratettix marshalli Hancock, J.L., 1909 c g
 Paratettix meridionalis (Rambur, 1838) c g - type species (as Tetrix meridionalis Rambur)
 Paratettix mexicanus (Saussure, 1861) i c g b (Mexican pygmy grasshopper)
 Paratettix nigrescens Sjöstedt, 1921 c g
 Paratettix obesus Bolívar, I., 1887 c g
 Paratettix obliteratus Bey-Bienko, 1951 c g
 Paratettix obtusopulvillus Günther, K., 1979 c g
 Paratettix overlaeti Günther, K., 1979 c g
 Paratettix pallipes (Walker, F., 1871) c g
 Paratettix pictus Hancock, J.L., 1910 c g
 Paratettix proximus (Hancock, J.L., 1907) c g
 Paratettix pullus Bolívar, I., 1887 c g
 Paratettix rotundatus Hancock, J.L., 1915 c g
 Paratettix ruwenzoricus Rehn, J.A.G., 1914 c g
 Paratettix scaber (Thunberg, 1815) c g
 Paratettix scapularis (Palisot De Beauvois, 1805) c g
 Paratettix schochi Bolívar, I., 1887 b (broad-legged pygmy grasshopper)
 Paratettix shelfordi Hancock, J.L., 1909 c g
 Paratettix singularis Shiraki, 1906 c g
 Paratettix sinuatus Morse, 1900 c g
 Paratettix spathulatus (Stål, 1861) c g
 Paratettix striata (Palisot De Beauvois, 1805) c g
 Paratettix subiosum Bolívar, I., 1887 c g
 Paratettix subpustulata (Walker, F., 1871) c g
 Paratettix toltecus (Saussure, 1861) i c g b (toltec pygmy grasshopper)
 Paratettix tumidus Günther, K., 1938 c g
 Paratettix uvarovi Semenov, 1915 c g
 Paratettix variabilis Bolívar, I., 1887 c g
 Paratettix vexator Günther, K., 1938 c g
 Paratettix villiersi Günther, K., 1979 c g
 Paratettix voeltzkowiana Saussure, 1899 c g
 Paratettix zonata (Walker, F., 1871) c g

Data sources: i = ITIS, c = Catalogue of Life, g = GBIF, b = Bugguide.net

References

Further reading

External links
 

Tetrigidae
Articles created by Qbugbot